Eucalyptus creta, commonly known as the large-fruited gimlet, is a species of mallet or tree that is endemic to Western Australia. It has smooth, shiny bark, lance-shaped adult leaves, flower buds in groups of three in leaf axils, relatively large white to creamy yellow flowers, and broadly hemispherical to bell-shaped fruit.

Description
Eucalyptus creta is a mallet or tree that typically grows to a height of  but does not form a lignotuber. It has smooth, shiny, yellowish, greenish or brownish to copper-coloured bark. Flowering occurs in May and the flowers are white to creamy yellow. The fruit is a woody, hemispherical to shallow cup-shaped capsule with two wings along the sides and the valves at the same level as the rim or extended beyond it.

Taxonomy and naming
Eucalyptus creta was first formally described in 1991 by Lawrie Johnson and Ken Hill from a specimen collected north of Mount Ney, north-east of Esperance. The specific epithet (creta) is a Latin word meaning "grow" or "increase", "referring to the buds, flowers and fruit".

Distribution and habitat
Large-fruited gimlet is locally common in a restricted area north-east of Esperance in the Esperance Plains and Mallee biogeographic regions, where it grows on calcareous plains in sandy loam or clay with little understorey vegetation.

Conservation status
This eucalypt is classified as "Priority Three" by the Government of Western Australia Department of Parks and Wildlife meaning that it is poorly known and known from only a few locations but is not under imminent threat.

See also
List of Eucalyptus species

References

creta
Endemic flora of Western Australia
Mallees (habit)
Myrtales of Australia
Eucalypts of Western Australia
Trees of Australia
Goldfields-Esperance
Endangered flora of Australia
Taxa named by Lawrence Alexander Sidney Johnson
Taxa named by Ken Hill (botanist)